Harmer is a surname. Notable people with the surname include:

Alfred C. Harmer (1825–1900), American politician from Pennsylvania
Ambrose Harmer (died c.1647), Virginia colonial politician
Barbara Harmer (1953–2011), English Concorde pilot
Dani Harmer (born 1989), British actress
Florence Harmer (1890–1976), English historian
Frederic William Harmer (1835–1923), English geologist
Frederick Harmer (1884–1919), English athlete
John Harmer (bishop) (1857–1944), Anglican bishop of Adelaide, then of Rochester
John Harmer (mayor) (fl. 1737–47), Virginia colonial politician
John L. Harmer (born 1934), American politician
Juliet Harmer (born 1943), British actress
Lillian Harmer (1883 – 1946), American character actress 
Nick Harmer (born 1975), American rock musician
Russell Harmer (1896–1940), British sailor
Sarah Harmer (born 1970), Canadian singer-songwriter
Sidney Frederic Harmer (1862–1950), British zoologist
Wendy Harmer (born 1955), Australian writer and comedian

See also
Harmer Hill, village in Shropshire, England
Harmer E. Davis Transportation Library at the University of California at Berkeley

See also
Harmar (disambiguation)